The scarlet-breasted flowerpecker (Prionochilus thoracicus) is a species of bird in the family Dicaeidae.
It is found in Brunei, Indonesia, Malaysia, and Thailand.
Its natural habitats are subtropical or tropical moist lowland forest and subtropical or tropical swamps.
It is threatened by habitat loss.

References

External links
Image at ADW

scarlet-breasted flowerpecker
Birds of Malesia
scarlet-breasted flowerpecker
Taxonomy articles created by Polbot